Last of the Summer Wine's ninth series originally aired on BBC1 between 1 January 1986 and 27 December 1987. All episodes from this series were written by Roy Clarke and produced and directed by Alan J. W. Bell.

The ninth series was released on DVD in region 2 as a box set on 5 May 2008.

Outline
The trio in this series consisted of:

First appearances

Seymour Utterthwaite (1986–1990)
Edie Pegden (1986–2003)
Barry Wilkinson (1986-1990, 1996–2010)
Glenda Wilkinson (1986–2010)
Eli Duckett (1987–2002)
Second Policeman (1987, 1990–2004)

Last appearances

Wally Batty (1975–1987)
Crusher (1984–1987)

List of episodes

New Year Special (1986)

Christmas Special (1986)

Regular series

Christmas Special (1987)

When recordings were "repackaged" for overseas sale, UK series 9 (12 episodes) was split into "Season 9" and "Season 10" (each of 6 episodes), with all subsequent "seasons" being renumbered accordingly. As a result, (for example) "Series 27" in the UK may be referred to as "Season 28" in the USA.

DVD release
The box set for series nine was released by Universal Playback in May 2008, mislabelled as a box set for series 9 & 10.

Notes

References

External links
Series 9 at the Internet Movie Database

Last of the Summer Wine series
1987 British television seasons
1986 British television seasons